Yogesh Rawat (born 28 December 1992) is an Indian cricketer who plays for Madhya Pradesh. He made his List A debut on 27 February 2014, for Madhya Pradesh in the 2013–14 Vijay Hazare Trophy.

References

External links
 

1992 births
Living people
Indian cricketers
Madhya Pradesh cricketers
People from Pauri Garhwal district